Mary Hannay Foott (pen name, La Quenouille; 26 September 1846 – 12 October 1918), was a Scottish-born Australian poet and editor. She is well remembered for a bush-ballad poem,"Where the Pelican Builds".

Early life
Mary Hannay Foott was born in Glasgow to a merchant, James Black, and his wife, née Grant. The family moved to Australia in 1853 and lived for some years at Mordialloc, near Melbourne, where Mary attended Miss Harper's school. She became one of the first students at Melbourne's National Gallery of Victoria Art School. She also studied painting under Louis Buvelot.

Writings
In 1874, Mary married Thomas Wade Foott, with whom she lived for three years in Bourke, New South Wales. In 1877, her husband took her up-country, to the Paroo River in South West Queensland. Her experiences there are described in one of her poems, "New Country", and her next seven years in that country had a great influence on her writings. Her husband died in 1884 through over-work and exposure during a drought of that year, when their losses of stock were so great that Mrs Foott was faced with selling her interest in the property and moving to Toowoomba, Queensland.

In July 1885, Foott went to Rocklea, near Brisbane, where she opened a private school, which supported her family. In the same year she published a first volume, Where the Pelican Builds and Other Poems, and began to do journalistic work for The Queenslander and the Brisbane Courier. In 1887, she joined the staff of The Queenslander, where she wrote under the pseudonym "La Quenouille", but several stories also appeared in her own name. These have never been collected. Morna Lee and Other Poems, largely a reprint of her first volume, was published in 1890. Foott continued her literary work for many years at Brisbane, and from 1907 at Bundaberg, Queensland, where she died in October 1918.

Foott's published verse was small in quantity but usually of good quality. One of her several bush ballads, entitled "Where the Pelican Builds", appears in most Australian anthologies.

Personal life
Foott's younger son, Arthur Patrick Foott, was a journalist, who enlisted in the 1st Australian Pioneer Battalion in 1916. A private, he was killed in action at Passchendaele in September 1917. She was survived by her other son, Brigadier-General Cecil Henry Foott, CB, CMG, who was born on 16 January 1876, educated as an engineer, and served with distinction in the Great War, being mentioned six times in dispatches. He commanded the 4th Division A.M.F. in 1929–1931, and died on 27 June 1942.

Legacy
Foott Street in the Canberra suburb of Garran is named in Mary Hannay Foott's honour.

Selected works

Poetry collections
Where the Pelican Builds and Other Poems, Gordon & Gotch, Brisbane, 1885
Morna Lee and Other Poems, Gordon & Gotch, London and Brisbane, 2nd edition, 1890

Play
Sweep: A comedy for children in three acts, Gordon & Gotch, Brisbane, 1891

Individual works
"Where the Pelican Builds" (1881)

References

Bibliography
Debra Adelaide (1988), Australian women writers: a bibliographic guide, London, Pandora

External links

Margaret Henry and Cecil Hadgraft, "Foott, Mary Hannay (1846–1918)", Australian Dictionary of Biography, Volume 4, Melbourne University Press, 1972, pp. 194–195
Text of Where the Pelican Builds and Other Poems.

1846 births
1918 deaths
Australian women poets
Australian women dramatists and playwrights
People from Bundaberg
Pseudonymous women writers
19th-century Australian dramatists and playwrights
19th-century Australian poets
19th-century Australian women writers
20th-century Australian dramatists and playwrights
20th-century Australian poets
20th-century Australian women writers
19th-century pseudonymous writers
20th-century pseudonymous writers
People from Mordialloc, Victoria
Scottish emigrants to colonial Australia
National Gallery of Victoria Art School alumni